Metro West or MetroWest may refer to:

MetroWest, a region containing the western suburbs of Boston
Metro West (Virginia), a development under construction in Fairfax County, Virginia
Metro West Conference, a high school athletic conference in Minnesota
Metro West, a proposed line of the planned Dublin Metro
MetroWest (Orlando), Florida, a planned community 
MetroWest (Bristol), England, a proposed rail network 
Sydney Metro West, a metro line under construction in Sydney, Australia.